He Got Game is a 1998 American sports drama film written, produced and directed by Spike Lee and starring Denzel Washington and Ray Allen. The film revolves around Jake Shuttlesworth (Denzel Washington), father of the top-ranked basketball prospect in the country, Jesus Shuttlesworth (Ray Allen). Jake, in prison for killing his wife, is released on parole for a week by the state's governor to persuade his son to play for the governor's alma mater in exchange for a reduced prison sentence.

Plot 
Jesus Shuttlesworth, the top high-school basketball player in the United States, is being pursued by the top college basketball programs in the nation. His father, Jake, is a convicted felon serving time at Attica Correctional Facility for accidentally killing his wife, Martha, Jesus' mother, six years earlier. Jake is granted a work release by the governor, an influential alumnus of "Big State," one of the colleges Jesus is considering, so that he might persuade his son to sign with Big State. If successful, he'll get an early release from prison.

In his first moments outside of prison, Jake contacts his daughter, Mary Shuttlesworth, who is happy to see him. When Jesus returns home from school, he refuses to look his father in the eye, and tells his sister to get rid of the "stranger" in their living room. Jesus later agrees to meet with his father at an alternative location away from Mary. Throughout the movie, Jake tries to persuade Jesus to attend Big State with seemingly no success. Eventually, he divulges the deal set up by the governor, but Jesus appears unsympathetic to his father's situation.

Flashbacks illustrate the younger Jesus' grueling basketball training under his father and the night an argument between Jake and Jesus escalated into violence, resulting in Jake accidentally killing Jesus' mother after she intervened.

Intertwined with the story of the Shuttlesworth family is the sub-plot of Dakota Barns, a prostitute who stays in the room next to Jake in a run-down hotel. Dakota is being abused by her pimp, Sweetness, which Jake overhears through the thin walls. Throughout the film, Jake helps Dakota by cleaning her wounds and giving her some of his per diem money and the two develop a romantic relationship. In one of the final scenes, Dakota rides a Greyhound bus away from New York City.

Jesus is tempted with offers of cash and women on recruiting visits to big-time basketball programs. He also considers entering the NBA draft in order to play professionally sooner and immediately lift himself and his sister out of poverty. Unable to get through to his son, Jake challenges Jesus to one last game of one-on-one basketball. If Jake wins, Jesus will sign a letter of intent to play for Big State and if Jesus wins, he can make his own decision. After a competitive start, Jake tires during the course of the game and Jesus wins. As Jake is collected for transportation back to Attica, he turns to Jesus and says, "Let me tell you something, son: You get that hatred out your heart, or you'll end up just another nigga ... like your father."

Ultimately, Jesus decides to sign to play for Big State and gives Jake his blessing. However, the governor does not give Jake the promised reduction, as Jesus did not sign the letter of intent, and Jake's work release is fabricated to the media as an escape attempt. Jake ultimately finds freedom by casting away his dreams and burdens to his son, symbolized by his throwing of an old basketball over the prison wall where it magically lands on the Big State court where Jesus is practicing alone. Jesus clutches the ball, knowing it is a message of hope from his father.

Cast
 Denzel Washington as Jake Shuttlesworth
 Ray Allen as Jesus Shuttlesworth
Jade Yorker as Jesus Shuttlesworth (age 12)
 Milla Jovovich as Dakota Barns
 John Turturro as Coach Billy Sunday
 Rosario Dawson as Lala Bonilla
 Jim Brown as Spivey
 Joseph Lyle Taylor as Crudup
 Hill Harper as Coleman "Booger" Sykes
 Shortee Reed as Coleman "Booger" Sykes (age 12)
 Zelda Harris as Mary Shuttlesworth
 Quinn Harris as Mary Shuttlesworth (age 6)
 Ned Beatty as Warden Marcel Wyatt
 Bill Nunn as Uncle Bubba
 Michele Shay as Aunt Sally
 Thomas Jefferson Byrd as "Sweetness"
 Roger Guenveur Smith as Willie "Big Time Willie"
 Lonette McKee as Martha Shuttlesworth
 Travis Best as Sip
 Walter McCarty as Mance
 Kim Director as Lynn
 John Wallace as Lonnie
 Rick Fox as Chick Deagan
 Leonard Roberts as D'Andre Mackey
 Jennifer Esposito as Ms. Janus
 Tiffany Jones as Buffy
 Jill Kelly as Suzie
 Al Palagonia as Dom Pagnotti
 Arthur J. Nascarella as Coach Cincotta

Production
Filming took place between July and September 1997. Locations included Coney Island, Brooklyn, Cabrini–Green housing projects in Chicago, Illinois, Elon University, Charlotte, North Carolina, and Los Angeles, California.

For the role of Jesus, Lee had drawn up a list of every NBA player who could pass for a high school senior. Kobe Bryant was the original choice to portray Jesus Shuttlesworth, but after shooting several air balls that resulted in a brutal playoff loss to the Utah Jazz in the 1997 NBA Playoffs, he planned an extensive workout plan that would help maintain his strength throughout the duration of the longer NBA seasons. Lee found Tracy McGrady too reserved and was not impressed by Allen Iverson's performance. Management for Kevin Garnett and Stephon Marbury wanted a guarantee that one or the other would be offered the part. Travis Best, Walter McCarty, and Rick Fox also auditioned, and Lee cast them in supporting roles.  Lee approached Allen during halftime of a Bucks-Knicks game, ultimately offering him the role of Jesus. Allen had never acted before, and he trained with an acting coach for eight weeks prior to filming.

NBA players Shaquille O'Neal, Reggie Miller, Bill Walton, Scottie Pippen, Michael Jordan, and Charles Barkley, Syracuse University coach Jim Boeheim, NBA coaches Rick Pitino and George Karl and broadcaster Dick Vitale made cameo appearances at one point early in the film.
Former football legend Jim Brown also appears as one of Jake's parole officers, assigned to keep tabs on him while he's away from the prison.

Release

Box office
He Got Game was produced on an estimated $25 million budget. In the opening weekend of its release, it was shown on 1,319 screens, and took in $7,610,663 at the U.S. box offices debuting at #1. It eventually grossed a total of $21,554,585.00, which was a box office flop considering it fell short of its $25 million budget.

Critical response
On review aggregator Rotten Tomatoes, the film holds an approval rating of 81% based on 63 reviews, with an average rating of 6.87/10. The website's critics consensus reads: "Though not without its flaws, He Got Game finds Spike Lee near the top of his game, combining trenchant commentary with his signature visuals and a strong performance from Denzel Washington." At Metacritic, the film has a weighted average score of 64 out of 100, based on 21 critics, indicating "generally favorable reviews". Audiences polled by CinemaScore gave the film an average grade of "B+" on an A+ to F scale.

Time Out London writing, "Most scenes play too long, with a surplus of ideas, textures, tones and characters, and after 134 minutes it's clear Lee's problem with closure hasn't gone away."  Roger Ebert gave the film three-and-a-half-stars, and called it Lee's best film since Malcolm X. He was particularly encouraged by Lee's determination not to adhere to typical conventions.

Both Ray Allen and Washington drew praise for their performances, with Roger Ebert writing that Allen "is that rarity, an athlete who can act," and Slate magazine writing that Washington's performance was "gorgeously underplayed".

Bill Simmons' review for ESPN pointed out factual flaws in the story: "...coaches aren't allowed to discuss potential recruits until after the signing period. Come on, Spike. (And while we're at it, players aren't allowed to visit a college one week before the signing deadline; Jesus couldn't live alone with his sister without both of them being thrown in a foster home," and argued "there's NO WAY IN HELL that Jesus wouldn't have just turned pro if he was that good and that broke.)"

Soundtrack

The soundtrack for He Got Game was composed of numerous orchestral pieces by Aaron Copland with songs created by Public Enemy. It was released by Def Jam on April 21, 1998.

Awards and nominations
1999 Acapulco Black Film Festival
 Best Actor — Denzel Washington (nominated)
 Best Director — Spike Lee (nominated)
 Best Screenplay — Spike Lee (nominated)
 Best Film (nominated)
 Best Soundtrack (nominated)

1999 NAACP Image Awards
 Outstanding Lead Actor in a Motion Picture — Denzel Washington (nominated)
 Outstanding Youth Actor/Actress — Zelda Harris (nominated)
 Outstanding Motion Picture (nominated)

1999 MTV Movie Awards
 MTV Movie Award Best Breakthrough Male Performance — Ray Allen (nominated)

1998 Stinkers Bad Movie Awards
 Worst Sense of Direction — Spike Lee (nominated)

References

External links
 
 
 
 

1998 films
1990s sports drama films
Films about interracial romance
40 Acres and a Mule Filmworks films
American basketball films
American sports drama films
African-American films
1990s English-language films
Films directed by Spike Lee
Films set in Brooklyn
Films shot in Illinois
Films shot in New York City
Films shot in New Jersey
Films shot in North Carolina
Films shot in Virginia
Hood films
American prison films
Films with screenplays by Spike Lee
Touchstone Pictures films
Uxoricide in fiction
African-American drama films
1998 drama films
Films about father–son relationships
Films produced by Jon Kilik
1990s American films